Kartik Mohapatra (1952-2015) was an Indian politician. He was elected to the Lok Sabha, the lower house of the Parliament of India as a member of the Indian National Congress.

References

External links
Official biographical sketch in Parliament of India website

1952 births
2015 deaths
Lok Sabha members from Odisha
India MPs 1991–1996
India MPs 1996–1997
Indian National Congress politicians from Odisha